Grepp is a surname. Notable people with the surname include:

Gerda Grepp (1907–1940), Norwegian translator, journalist, and socialist
Kyrre Grepp (1879–1922), Norwegian politician
Lotte Grepp Knutsen (born 1973), Norwegian politician
Michael Grepp (born 1985), American singer-songwriter
Rachel Grepp (1879–1961), Norwegian journalist and politician